Bach v Longman 2 Cowper 623 (1777) is a landmark judgment regarding copyright. The case related to whether printed music fell within the protection of the Statute of Anne (1710). Lord Mansfield held that published music is protected as 'writing' within the terms of the legislation.

Johann Christian Bach and Karl Friedrich Abel sued publisher James Longman who had been violating the copyright of their works in London.

The only copyright legislation at the time was the Statute of Anne, which was assumed not to cover music.
However, the judge, Lord Mansfield, found that the Statute's preamble referred to "books and other writings." This he felt included written music. His decision allowed for a spate of further cases and a more stable performing environment that allowed the growth of freelance musicians in the 18th century.

Further reading
 Sanjek, R., American Popular Music and Its Business: The First Four Hundred Years, 3 vols. (New York and Oxford: Oxford University Press, 1988)
 Hunter, D., 'Music Copyright in Britain to 1800', Music & Letters, 67 (1986): 269–82 (273) 
 Carroll, M., 'The Struggle for Music Copyright', Florida Law Review, 57 (2005): 907–61

References

Copyright case law
Court of King's Bench (England) cases
1777 in British law
1777 in England